Whispers in the Dark is the debut album by American R&B group, Profyle. This is their first album with Motown Records released on June 29, 1999.

Track listing
 Just Can't Get You Off My Mind (John Robinson, Todd Burns, Joey Elias) (4:15)
 I Ain't The One (John Robinson, Rick Cousin, Joey Elias) (3:58)
 Jiggy Girl (Joe Thomas, Joshua P. Thompson) (3:28)
 Too Shady (featuring Cha Cha) (Brian Casey, Brandon Casey, Teddy Bishop, Parris Fluellen) (3:13)
 Whispers In The Dark (Joe Thomas, Joshua P. Thompson) (4:34)
 I Won't Cry (Wayne Hector, L. Tennant, Carsten Schack, Kenneth Karlin) (4:27)
 Don't Be Trippin' (Teddy Bishop, Johnta Austin, Elgin Lumpkin) (4:51)
 Can't Let Go (Anthony Dent, Kevin Hicks, Johnta Austin) (3:46)
 Somebody Like Me (Teddy Bishop, Johnta Austin) (3:55)
 Overjoyed (Stevie Wonder) (4:07)
 Kick It Tonight (Joe Thomas, Jolyon Skinner, Ralph B. Stacey) (4:24)
 Lady (Tom Hammer, Sandra St. Victor) (4:50)
 Make Sure You're Home (featuring Joe & Chico DeBarge) (5:25)
 I Ain't The One (Remix featuring Juvenile) (John Robinson, Todd Burns, Joey Elias, Terius Grey) (4:09)

Personnel
 Profyle, Joe, Chico DeBarge, Johnta Austin, Baby Doll - background vocals
 Eric Jackson, Randy Bowland - guitar
 William Lockwood, Jr. - live brushes
 Eric Johnson - bass, keyboards
 Bryan-Michael Cox - additional keyboards
 Ed Miller, Mike Alvord, Jason Goldstein, Manny Marroquin, Bryan-Michael Cox - recording engineers
 Manny Marroqin, Earl Cohen, Bob Brockman - mixing
 Kedar Massenburg, Joe - executive producers
 Tom Coyne - mastering
 Dwayne Shaw - art direction

References

1999 albums
Profyle albums
Motown albums